Daniiar Martovich Duldaev (born 27 October 1992) is a Kyrgyzstani tennis player.

Duldaev has a career high ATP singles ranking of 607 achieved on 14 July 2014. He also has a career high ATP doubles ranking of 484 achieved on 12 May 2014.

Duldaev represents Kyrgyzstan at the Davis Cup where he has a W/L record of 8–0.

Future and Challenger finals

Singles: 3 (1–2)

Doubles 7 (2–5)

Davis Cup

Participations: (8–0)

   indicates the outcome of the Davis Cup match followed by the score, date, place of event, the zonal classification and its phase, and the court surface.

External links

1992 births
Living people
Kyrgyzstani tennis players
Male tennis players
Sportspeople from Bishkek
Tennis players at the 2010 Asian Games
Tennis players at the 2014 Asian Games
Asian Games competitors for Kyrgyzstan